The name Patricia was used for five tropical cyclones in the Eastern Pacific:
Hurricane Patricia (1970) – remained in the open ocean
Hurricane Patricia (1974) – caused no known damage or deaths
Hurricane Patricia (2003) – remained at sea, causing no damage
Tropical Storm Patricia (2009) – briefly affected parts of Baja California Sur, causing no damage
Hurricane Patricia (2015) – strongest storm ever recorded in the Western Hemisphere, the second-strongest worldwide in terms of pressure, and the strongest in terms of 1-minute sustained winds.

After the 2015 storm, the name Patricia was retired and replaced with Pamela for the 2021 season.

The name Patricia was also used for one tropical cyclone in the Western Pacific:
 Typhoon Patricia (1949) - A category 4 typhoon

References

Pacific hurricane set index articles